State Road 241 (NM 241) is a  state highway in the U.S. state of New Mexico. New Mexico 241's western terminus is at NM 209 in Broadview, and the eastern terminus is at Farm to Market Road 1058 (FM 1058) at the Texas–New Mexico border.

Major intersections

See also

References

241
Transportation in Curry County, New Mexico